Chesty XV is the mascot of the United States Marine Corps. A male English Bulldog, he is named after Chesty Puller.

Chesty XV was acquired by the Marine Corps in March 2018 and trained with his predecessor Chesty XIV until August 31, 2018, when he assumed duties as mascot of the Marine Corps.

See also
 Jiggs II
 List of individual dogs

References

|-

|-

United States Marine Corps lore and symbols
Military animals
Individual dogs in the United States
American mascots